Smoke and Mirrors is 2008 crime novel by Australian author Kel Robertson. It won the 2009 Ned Kelly Award. It is the second novel in the author's series about Australian Chinese Federal Police detective Brad Chen.

Reviews

 AustCrime Blog
 Fair Dinkum Crime

Awards and nominations

 2009 won Ned Kelly Award - joint winner with Deep Water by Peter Corris

References

2008 Australian novels
Australian crime novels
Ned Kelly Award-winning works